The Battle of Biržai was a series of skirmishes during the January Uprising. They took place on May 7–9, 1863, in the area of Lithuanian town of Biržai, at the time part of the Russian Empire's Kaunas Governorate. Lithuanian rebels commanded by Zygmunt Sierakowski, clashed here with the Imperial Russian Army.

In early May 1863, Sierakowski and his men tried to break through Russian cordon to Courland, where a maritime transport with weapons was announced. After several clashes, Sierakowski's unit was destroyed, which ended the insurrection in Lithuania.

Battle of Medeikai 
On May 7, first clash took place near Medeikai, 10 kilometers north of Biržai. Sierakowski divided his party into three columns, and ordered to march to Biržai. They were faced by troops of the Imperial Russian Army, which included Cossacks, uhlans, infantry and Finnish riflemen. Left rebel column of Bolesław Kołyszko was attacked by the Russians. After a heavy fight, the rebels, reinforced with additional forces sent by Sierakowski, managed to kill 65 and wound 75 Russians.

Battle of Gudiškis 
On May 8, Russian command sent reinforcements to the unit which had been defeated in Medeikai the day before. Near the Gudiškis village (3 kilometers southeast from Medeikai), they clashed with Sierakowski. A scythemen attack was fought off by the Russians, and the battle ended in rebel defeat. Sierakowski, himself wounded, lost 200 men (killed and wounded), and ordered a withdrawal, nominating Ignacy Laskowski new commandant of the party.

Battle of Šniurkiškiai 
On May 9, 1863, new rebel commandant, Ignacy Laskowski, ordered his forces to camp in a forest near . The rebels were completely taken by surprise, when the Russians attacked them. For one hour, priest Antanas Mackevičius defended rebel positions, but was defeated and rebel survivors fled from battlefield.

Sources 
 

Conflicts in 1863
1863 in Lithuania
Birze
Kovno Governorate
May 1863 events
Military history of Lithuania